Breda is a city in the southern Netherlands.

Breda may also refer to the following:

Places
 Breda, Girona, a village in Catalonia, Spain
 Breda, Iowa, a small city in the United States
 Breda di Piave, a commune in the Treviso province, Italy
 Breda, County Down, a townland in County Down, Northern Ireland
 Bréda, a small river in eastern France, tributary of the Isère

People
 Breda (name), a list of people with the given name or surname
 Gustavo Breda Rodrigues (born 1986), Brazilian footballer known simply as Breda

Other uses
 Breda (genus), a genus of jumping spiders
 Breda Academy, a secondary school in Belfast, Northern Ireland
 Breda machine gun (disambiguation), a number of machine guns
 Breda Royal Beer, generally known as simply Breda, a Dutch lager sold almost exclusively in the Channel Islands
 , various British warships
 NAC Breda, a football club based in Breda, Netherlands
 Società Italiana Ernesto Breda, aka Breda Costruzioni Ferroviarie or simply Breda, an Italian industrial manufacturer
 , a Dutch cargo ship sunk in 1940

See also
 Van Breda, a list of people with the surname